"Bully for Steve" is the sixteenth episode of the fifth season of the animated comedy series American Dad!

It originally aired in the United States on Fox on April 25, 2010. The episode follows Stan who is unhappy with Steve's passive behavior, so he poses as a bully for Steve to toughen him up, despite Francine's disapproval.

The episode was written by Matt Fusfeld and Alex Cuthbertson and directed by Rodney Clouden. "Bully for Steve" was watched by 5.31 million viewers in its original airing. The episode received positive reviews with its main plot, along with mixed reviews with its subplot, from critics. The episode features guest performances of Jeff Fischer, Kevin Michael Richardson, Cleo King, and Erik Durbin.

Plot
Stan learns that Steve is too passive and resorts to confronting Steve as a bully. Steve quickly figures out the bully is his own dad. After a physical confrontation, Steve comes home injured and Stan asks him what happened and changes the topic to his own high school experience being bullied by a Greek student named Stelio Kontos. He also tells Steve that, as bullies do not just go away, he must deal with them. Francine opposes this approach, saying that violence is never the answer, so Stan threatens to beat Steve up further if he ever tells her he is being bullied by his dad.

Francine notifies Principal Lewis of her increasing concern for Steve, and despite Stan's threats to keep Steve from telling, Lewis reviews the security camera. Francine finds out that Stan is the bully. Nervous, Stan flees from the school, with Francine chasing him, eventually crashing her car into his SUV as he tries to escape from her wrath. Enraged at Stan's actions, Francine tries to train Steve to fight back, but is unsuccessful, and Steve is unable to dodge Stan with an old lady disguise. Finally accepting that he cannot avoid being bullied, Steve decides to settle things at the school playground the next day at 3:00. However, instead of fighting himself, Steve hires Stelio Kontos to beat Stan up. Stelio violently beats Stan, leaving him bloodied and bruised to the point where he finally admits defeat. After the fight, Stan is considerably injured and humiliated, but respectfully acknowledges Steve for overcoming his bully in his own way.

Meanwhile, Reginald asks Hayley out on a date, which she agrees. They arrive at the carnival and encounter Jeff Fischer, who is working there. After engaging in a brief conversation with each other, Hayley and Jeff reconnect, with Reginald understanding.

In another subplot, Roger attempts a career as a crime scene photographer, and finally achieves success with a picture of Stan's injuries from the fight. He is assigned to a "brutal triple rape right off the freeway" by Captain Crunch.

Production
The episode was written by series regulars Matt Fusfeld and Alex Cuthbertson and was directed by series regular Rodney Clouden. It's the second episode Clouden, Fusfeld, and Cuthbertson worked on this season, their previous episode being "Don't Look a Smith Horse in the Mouth." Ron Hughart and Brent Woods served as supervising directors for "Bully for Steve." Erik Sommers served as the main producer for the episode, with Laura McCreary and Erik Durbin serving as co-producers, along with Chris McKenna and Matt McKenna as supervising producers. Walter Murphy, a regular music composer for the music of MacFarlane-produced shows, including the opening theme songs of American Dad! and The Cleveland Show, composed the music for the episode.

In addition to the regular cast, actress Cleo King guest starred in the episode. Recurring voice actors Jeff Fischer and Kevin Michael Richardson, and co-producer Erik Durbin also guest starred in the episode.

Cultural references
A recurring gag throughout the episode is Stan insulting Steve with a sexual joke involving the usage of the phrase, "That's what your mom said last night," a variation of the original phrase, "That's what she said."  When Stan is driving in his SUV right after fleeing the high school, he sings a soundtrack of Drops of Jupiter by the musical group Train. Francine directly mentions the marine theme park SeaWorld when she says she needs to "punch a dolphin," while Steve mentions the social networking site Facebook, where he says he found Stelio Kontos. Towards the end of the episode, Cap'n Crunch appears at the police station when he decides to give Roger the job for presenting the injured Stan, demonstrating Roger's talents in crime scene photography.

Reception
"Bully for Steve" was broadcast on April 25, 2010, as a part of an animated television night on Fox, and was preceded by The Simpsons, The Cleveland Show, and Family Guy. It was watched by 5.31 million viewers, according to Nielsen ratings. The episode also acquired a 2.7/7 rating in the 18–49 demographic, beating The Cleveland Show but scoring below The Simpsons and Family Guy. The episode's ratings increased slightly from the show's last episode, "Merlot Down Dirty Shame," and its total viewership increased by 2.65%.

The episode's main plot was met with positive reception by television critics and fans alike upon its initial release, while its subplot received mixed reception. The Los Angeles Times Show Tracker blog gave a positive review to the episode. They comment its main plot, Stan teaching Steve a lesson, as "the next best thing to Roger’s insanity." Jason Hughes of TV Squad also praised the episode overall, commenting that the main plot of Stan bullying Steve "was a stroke of genius by the creators of 'American Dad.'" Hughes said it "fits in perfectly with [Steve's] character." He added "it led to so many other funny moments in the episode," noting both instances of the janitor's sudden werewolf transformation at school and the footage showing Principal Lewis "drinking an entire case of beer and peeing on the basketball hoop before heading off." However, he gave a mixed review to the episode's subplot involving the relationship between Hayley and Reginald, saying he could not "bring [him]self to really care about this relationship, or even Reginald at all." In a simultaneous review of the episode of The Simpsons that preceded the show, Todd VanDerWuff of The A.V. Club gave "Bully for Steve" a positive review, saying that the episode overall was "just purely funny." He praised Stan for "missing more and more work for this ridiculous quest to make Steve a better man," as well as Stelio Kontos for his own theme song and his fight scene with Stan. Overall, VanDerWuff said that the episode's main plot worked, suggesting that the relationship between Stan and Steve, their "mutual lack of understanding," is analogous to that between Homer and Lisa in The Simpsons. However, like Hughes of TV Squad, VanDerWuff criticized the episode's secondary plot, commenting Hayley and Reginald's relationship, "which seems to have reached its ending [...], continues to just not work, [...] since the ending to the storyline was fairly abrupt and out of nowhere." He rated the episode an A−, the highest grade of the night, scoring higher than The Simpsons episode "The Squirt and the Whale."

References

External links

2010 American television episodes
American Dad! (season 6) episodes
Television episodes about bullying